Richard Boyle O'Reilly Hocking (26 August, 1906 – 11 March, 2001) was an American philosopher and a professor of philosophy at Emory University. He was the son of William Ernest Hocking and grandson of John Boyle O'Reilly. He was a president of the Metaphysical Society of America (1970).

References

20th-century American philosophers
Philosophy academics
1906 births
2001 deaths
Presidents of the Metaphysical Society of America